Johnnie Dawson (November 8, 1914 – August 6, 1984) was an American Negro league catcher between 1938 and 1942.

A native of Shreveport, Louisiana, Dawson made his Negro leagues debut in 1938 with the Kansas City Monarchs, and played with the Chicago American Giants and Memphis Red Sox in 1940. He returned to the Monarchs during their 1942 Negro World Series championship season, Dawson's final season in baseball. He died in Los Angeles, California in 1984 at age 69.

References

External links
 and Seamheads

1914 births
1984 deaths
Birmingham Black Barons players
Chicago American Giants players
Kansas City Monarchs players
Memphis Red Sox players
20th-century African-American sportspeople
Baseball catchers